Bryan Engelhardt (born 10 January 1982 in Curaçao) is a Dutch baseball player who currently plays for Quick Amersfoort and the Dutch national team.  Engelhardt was selected by coach Robert Eenhoorn in the team that represents the Netherlands at the 2008 Summer Olympics in Beijing.

External links
Engelhardt's profile at honkbalsite.com

References

1982 births
2009 World Baseball Classic players
Baseball players at the 2008 Summer Olympics
Curaçao baseball players
Dutch people of Curaçao descent
Living people
Olympic baseball players of the Netherlands
Dutch baseball players